The 21st Actors and Actresses Union Awards ceremony was held on 18 June 2012 at the Teatro Circo Price in Madrid. The gala was hosted by Yayo Cáceres.

Winners and nominees 
The winners and nominees are listed as follows:

Film

Television

Theatre

Newcomers

References 

Actors and Actresses Union Awards
2012 in Madrid
2012 television awards
2012 film awards
2012 theatre awards
June 2012 events in Europe